The Worst is the second studio album by American Midwest rapper, Tech N9ne. It was released on September 12, 2000. Stylistically, its overall sound features a blend of G-funk, horrorcore and gangsta rap styles of hip hop music.

Track listing

Sample credits
All of the album's sample credits listed below were derived from the WhoSampled database.

"Walk These Shoes"
"Tom's Diner" (feat. Suzanne Vega) by DNA

"They're Gonna Laugh at You"
"Off the Wall" by Michael Jackson
"Thriller" by Michael Jackson
"It's Funky Enough" by The D.O.C.

"Get Blowed"
"One Love" by Whodini

"Thugged-Out"
"Heartz of Men" by Tupac

"Stamina"
"Gun, Machine Gun" - M-60: Short Burst by Sound Ideas

"Niggas"
"Niggaz 4 Life" by N.W.A

Reissue
The Worst: 2K Edition is a re-release of The Worst by American rapper Tech N9ne.   It features an updated track listing, including the replacement of three tracks for three newer tracks. ("Let's Get It Started", "Young Hooligans" and "Strange" replacing "Why? Tech N9ne", "Mad Confusion" and "They're All Gonna Laugh At You")

Track listing
"Stamina
"Planet Rock 2K" (Original Version) (featuring Don Juan and Sonya)
"Let's Get It Started" (featuring Kev, D-Loc & Dalima as Da Hooligans)
"Thugged Out" (featuring Gonzoe, Phats Bossi, Poppa L.Q. & Yukmouth)
"Mind of a Killer"
"The Worst" (featuring Law & Kemani)
"Walk These Shoes" (featuring Nachia Woodley)
"Trauma" (featuring Hannible Bear Lector and Rock Money)
"Young Hooligans" (featuring O.C., D-Loc & Dalima as Da Hooligans)
"Strange"
"Get Blowed" (featuring Bakarii, Mark Timley, Don Juan & L.V.)
"Niggas" (featuring Don Juan)
"One Night Stand" (featuring Nachia Woodley & Tuesday)
"I Didn't Lie" (featuring Lamani & Erin Smith)
"S.I.M.O.N. Says" (featuring Charmelle Cofield)
"Fucked Up Day2 (performed by Charmelle Cofield)
"Fucked Up Day" (featuring Paul Law)

References

2000 albums
Tech N9ne albums
G-funk albums
Horrorcore albums
Gangsta rap albums by American artists